The 1950 season was the Chicago Bears' 31st in the National Football League. The team matched on their 9–3 record from 1949 under head coach and owner George Halas, tied for first in the National Conference with the Los Angeles Rams, whom they had defeated twice in the regular season. They met in a tiebreaker playoff, won by the Rams, who advanced to the NFL Championship Game.

The Bears traveled by train to Los Angeles for the playoff game.

Regular season

Schedule

Standings

Playoffs 

 Unscheduled tiebreaker game for conference title

References 

Chicago Bears
Chicago Bears seasons
Chicago Bears